Silver Valley High School is a public high school in Yermo, California, in the High Desert of Southern California. The school is in the Silver Valley Unified School District.

Academic statistics
It provides educational services to the communities of Calico, Daggett, Fort Irwin, Ludlow, Newberry Springs and Yermo. Many of the families who live in the valley work in agriculture, railroading, trucking, local businesses, or on military bases. Sixty-five percent of the families are military or military-related.

General information
 Total students (as of 2009): 533
 Full-time teachers: 27
 Student/teacher ratio: 18:1

Race distribution
 Asian: 5%
 Black: 18%
 Hispanic: 20%
 Native American: 1%
 White/Other: 53%

Hall of Fame
 Johntavious "Jay" Jones # 7 Football C'15
 Brian Ili #2 Football
 Dauntarius "Will" Williams #8 Football, Track

Student graduation data (2005-2006)
 Number of 12th grade graduates: 59
 Number of 12th grade graduates who also completed UC/CSU courses: 18

Student dropouts (2005-2006)
 Number of dropouts: 4

Staff (2006-2007)
 Number of full-time paraprofessional staff: 5
 Number of full-time office/clerical staff: 5
 Number of full-time other staff: 4
 Number of part-time other staff: 5

Select enrollment (2006-2007 data)
 Enrollment in algebra or algebra II: 78
 Enrollment in advanced math course: 121
 Enrollment in first-year chemistry: 73
 Enrollment in first-year physics: 20
 Career-technical education enrollment: 216

Facilities
School Technology Infrastructure (2006-2007 data)
 Number of computers used for instructionally-related purposes: 235
 Number of classrooms or other instructional settings with internet access: 28

Special events

Clubs and activities
Academic Decathlon
Associated Student Body
Color Guard
Envirothon
Homeroom
Make a Difference Day
Step Team
Trojan Times, School Newspaper
Yearbook
Basketball

References

External links 
Silver Valley High School
Silver Valley Unified School District

Educational institutions in the United States with year of establishment missing
High schools in San Bernardino County, California
Public high schools in California
1979 establishments in California